The Kirkuk–Haifa oil pipeline (also known as the Iraq–Haifa pipeline or Mediterranean pipeline) was a crude oil pipeline from the oil fields in Kirkuk, located in the former Ottoman vilayet of Mosul in northern Iraq, through Transjordan to Haifa in mandatory Palestine (now in the territory of Israel). The pipeline was operational between 1935 and 1948. The oil arriving in Haifa was distilled in the Haifa refineries, stored in tanks, and then put in tankers for shipment to Europe.

The pipeline was built by the Iraq Petroleum Company between 1932 and 1934, during which period most of the area through which the pipeline passed was under a British mandate approved by the League of Nations. The pipeline was one of two carrying oil from the Baba Gurgur, Kirkuk oilfield to the Mediterranean coast. The double pipeline split at Haditha (Pumping Station K3) with a second line carrying oil to Tripoli, Lebanon, which was then under a French mandate. That line was built primarily to satisfy the demands of the French partner in IPC, Compagnie Française des Pétroles, for a separate line to be built across French mandated territory.

The pipeline and the Haifa refineries were considered strategically important by the British Government, and indeed provided much of the fuel needs of the British and American forces in the Mediterranean during World War II.

The pipeline was a target of attacks by Arabs during the 1936–1939 Arab revolt in Palestine, and as a result one of the main objectives of a joint British-Jewish Special Night Squads commanded by Captain Orde Wingate was to protect the pipeline against such attacks. Later on, the pipeline was the target of attacks by the Jewish Irgun paramilitary organisation.

In 1948, with the outbreak of the 1948 Arab–Israeli War, the official operation of the pipeline ended when the Iraqi Government refused to pump any more oil through it.

Oil pumping stations

These were named in numerical order going westwards, with the stations from Kirkuk to Haditha denoted "K" (after Kirkuk) and the subsequent ones to the Mediterranean coast at Haifa denoted "H" (after Haifa) and those to Tripoli denoted "T".
 K1 
 K2 
 K3 
 H1 
 H2 
 H3 
 H4 
 H5

See also

 Trans-Arabian Pipeline
 H-3 Air Base

References

External links
 U.S. checking possibility of pumping oil from northern Iraq to Haifa, via Jordan, Haaretz, 25 August 2003

Mandatory Palestine
History of the Middle East
Oil pipelines in Iraq
Oil pipelines in Jordan
Oil pipelines in Israel
Iraq–Jordan relations
Iraq–Israel relations